City of Women is a 1980 Italian fantasy comedy-drama film co-written (with Bernardino Zapponi and Brunello Rondi) and directed by Federico Fellini. Amid Fellini's characteristic combination of dreamlike, outrageous, and artistic imagery, Marcello Mastroianni plays Snàporaz, a man who voyages through male and female spaces toward a confrontation with his own attitudes toward women and his wife.

Plot
Snàporaz wakes up during a train ride and has a brief fling with a woman in the bathroom, but it's cut short when the train suddenly stops and the woman gets off. Snàporaz follows her into the woods, through a wilderness and into a Grand Hotel overrun with women in attendance for a surrealistic feminist convention. He winds up in a conference about polyandry, where his presence is rejected. A frightened Snàporaz retreats to the hotel lobby, but the exit is blocked; instead, he seeks refuge inside an elevator with a girl, Donatella, who offers her assistance.

Donatella leads Snàporaz into a gymnasium and forces him to don roller skates. He is yet again cornered and berated by a group of angry women who circle around him in roller skates and practice testicle-kicking with a dummy. Dazed, Snàporaz makes his exit down a flight of stairs, falling down and hurting himself, and into the domain of a burly woman tending to the hotel's furnace. The woman offers him a ride to the train station on her motorcycle, but she stops by a farm and lures Snàporaz into a nursery, where she tries to rape him. The rape is cut short by the woman's mother, who steps in to chastise her daughter. Snàporaz escapes and follows a lonely woman through the countryside. He joins her and her girlfriends in a car ride on the promise of being delivered to the station, but the ride goes on well into the night, the women smoking marijuana and listening to Italo disco. A frustrated Snàporaz ditches the women only to be harassed by others. He finally finds shelter at the mansion of Dr. Xavier Katzone, who shoots at his persecutors.

Dr. Katzone promises to deliver Snàporaz to the train station in the morning and invites him to stay for a party. Snàporaz walks around Katzone's extravagant home, which is filled with sexual imagery and phallic sculptures. He is also fascinated by a collection of photographs on the manor walls commemorating Katzone's sexual conquests; the photos light up and whisper arousing dialogue. Taking pride in his many inventions, Katzone celebrates his 10,000th conquest with an eccentric party that involves the blowing out of 10,000 candles and a performance by his wife, in which she sucks coins and pearls into her vagina by means of telekinesis. During the party, Snàporaz comes across his ex-wife, Elena, who has a drunken argument with him, and meets Donatella again.

The police (composed solely of women dressed in Nazi attire) arrive, interrupting Katzone mid-song and announcing the imminent demolition of his house. They also inform him that they have shot his most beloved dog, Italo, which a grieving Katzone buries. Meanwhile, Snàporaz dances to a song by Fred Astaire with a scantily clad Donatella and a friend of hers, but he fails to sleep with either of them, instead getting stuck in bed with his ex-wife. Hearing strange noises, he crawls under the bed, entering another dream-like world in which he slides down a toboggan, revisiting his childhood crushes (a sitter, a nurse, a prostitute) along the way. Caged at the end of the slide, he is transported before a strange court and judged for his masculinity. Dismissed and set free, he climbs into a towering boxing ring before a female crowd. At the top of the ring, he boards a hot air balloon in the form of Donatella. Donatella herself fires at him from below with a machine-gun, bursting the balloon and sending Snàporaz plummeting.

Snàporaz wakes up on the very same train from the beginning of the film, indicating the entire story has been a mere nightmare. Just as he comes to this conclusion, he realizes his glasses are broken (as in his dream) and that the wagon is filled by the women that crowded his dream. The train races into a tunnel as the film ends.

Cast

 Marcello Mastroianni as Snàporaz
 Anna Prucnal as Elena
 Bernice Stegers as Woman on train
 Donatella Damiani as Donatella (Woman on roller skates)
 Iole Silvani as Motorcyclist
 Ettore Manni as Dr. Xavier Katzone
 Fiammetta Baralla as Onlio
 Hélène G. Calzarelli as Feminist
 Isabelle Canto de Maya
 Catherine Carrel as Commandant
 Stéphane Emilfork as Feminist
 Marcello Di Falco as Slave
 Silvana Fusacchia as Skater
 Gabriella Giorgelli as Fishwoman of San Leo
 Sylvie Meyer as Feminist
 Dominique Labourier as Feminist
 Marina Confalone as Feminist 
 Marina Hedman as Girl of 'Giro della Morte'

Critical reception
Italy and France
City of Women opened in eighty Italian theaters in March 1980 and received generally favorable reviews bordering "on respect rather than praise". Corriere della Sera critic Giovanni Grazzini interpreted the film as "a catalogue of emotions, sometimes grotesque, sometimes farcical, which provides a few caustic jibes against the destruction of femininity by aggressive feminism... From a stylistic point of view, it's less homogeneous than usual but other parts of the film are delightful. For instance, when fantasy is used to create types of people rather than caricatures. In this sense Fellini, having abandoned his gallery of monsters, becomes more prosaic. Or when the ambiguity of certain characters - an excellent example is the soubrette played by the charming Donatella Damiani - provides a touch of grace and bitchiness; or when the film becomes almost a musical; or when paradox becomes surrealist, such as the party and the hurricane at the villa of Katzone who's in despair because his favourite dog has died".

"Fellini appears as the Madame Bovary of his adolescence", wrote Claudio G. Fava for Corriere Mercantile. "He revels in the enjoyment he feels at working with an experienced crew, side by side with faithful technicians who simulate trains on the move or the sea washing the shores of the inevitable Romagnol beaches as though they were working of the set of George Méliès. But then, again and again, Fellini has shown us that he is the greatest and most ingenious of Méliès's heirs. Only the magic does not always work, especially in the attempt to create a kind of astonished confession of amused impotence when faced with the new woman of today, together with a feeling of nostalgia for the old woman of the past... Despite Fellini's extraordinary virtuosity, the film rarely achieves harmony of inspiration, of order, of strip-cartoon fantasy, or of irony." Francesco Bolzoni of L'Avvenire insisted that Fellini was "only playing games. But then we would hardly expect from Fellini a deep analysis of the nature of women... It is a game with occasional gaps and, more often, inventions that rejuvenate an all too familiar, all too hackneyed subject. A surprising serenity predominates... It is a film with a tragic vein that in the end proves to be light-hearted and occasionally amusing". La Notte magazine's Giorgio Carbone felt the maestro had "finally reached a splendid maturity that permits him to lavish his treasures upon us for the simple pleasure of doing so. Behind the festival of images and colours we can feel his delight in making this film, a delight which, from the very first scene, becomes ours too, and it's something we haven't felt in a long time... If the film lacks suspense in its story (we care little what happens to Snàporaz or Katzone because we know that sooner or later Rimini and those bosomy extras will appear on the scene), there's suspense in the images and in the scenic inventions".

Screened out of competition on 19 May 1980 at the 33rd Cannes Film Festival, the film was badly received by the majority of French critics, some of whom offered review titles such as "Zero for Fellini", "A Tiring Deception", "A Disaster", as well as "A Mountain of Tedious Pretension". Russian film director Andrei Tarkovsky, in Rome that year for the pre-production of Nostalghia, noted in his diary that City of Women was a fiasco: "At the Cannes Festival the papers said that Fellini's last film was a total disaster, and that he himself had ceased to exist. It's terrible, but it's true, his film is worthless."

United States
Released by New Yorker Films in the United States on 8 April 1981, the film garnered generally favorable reviews but little box-office success. Daniel Talbot of New Yorker Films offered an explanation for the public's lack of interest: "Here, it played in less than fifty theatres, and of those, six provided 75 percent of the earnings. I don't know what Gaumont or Fellini could have expected with that kind of personal film. He had lost most of his audience here by then. Which isn't to say that I don't think him one of the great filmmakers of the world." For Vincent Canby of The New York Times, however, the film was a success: "Though the film is overlong, even for a Fellini aficionado, it is spell-binding, a dazzling visual display that is part burlesque, part satire, part Folies-Bergère, and all cinema. As Snàporaz is haunted by the phantoms of all the women he has known, or wanted to know, from childhood on, Mr Fellini in City of Women is obsessed by his own feelings toward women, by his need for them, his treatment (mostly poor) of them, his continued fascination by them and his awareness that (thank heavens) they'll always be different... Though City of Women is about a libertine, it's anything but licentious. Mr Fellini's licentiousness suggests a profound longing for some kind of protective discipline, if not complete chastity. As such discipline would destroy Snàporaz, it would make impossible the conception and production of a film as wonderfully uninhibited as City of Women."

John Gould Boyum of The Wall Street Journal observed that "the film's entire thrust has little or nothing to do with the striking of attitudes, the analyzing of ideas. What Fellini seems after here is the recording and communicating of a set of feelings: those complex, contradictory ones experienced by a middle-aged Italian male suddenly faced with a cataclysmic upheaval in social and sexual mores... We do not go to Fellini to immerse ourselves in story and character or to encounter ideas. What we want from the maestro and what he gives us are fabulous adventures in feeling - a decidedly original mixture of nostalgia, poignancy, and joy that is unmistakably Fellini's own."

References

Bibliography
 Alpert, Hollis (1988). Fellini: A Life. New York: Paragon House. 
 Fava, Claudio and Aldo Vigano (1990). The Films of Federico Fellini. New York: Citadel. 
 Kezich, Tullio (2006). Fellini: His Life and Work. New York: Faber and Faber. 
 Tarkovsky, Andrei (1994). Time Within Time: The Diaries 1970-1986. London: Faber and Faber. 

Further reading
 Lederman, Marie Jean. "Dreams and vision in Fellini's City of Women." Journal of Popular Film and Television, Volume 9, n° 3 Fall 1981, p. 114-22.
  Cini, Roberta. Nella città delle donne : femminile e sogno nel cinema di Federico Fellini, Tirrenia (Pisa): Edizioni del Cerro, 2008.
  Monti, Raffaele. Bottega Fellini: la Città delle donne: progetto, lavorazione, film, with photographs by Gabriele Stocchi. Roma: De Luca, [1981].

External links
 
 
 Review by Vincent Canby, The New York Times, April 1981

1980 films
1980s Italian-language films
1980s fantasy comedy-drama films
Italian fantasy comedy-drama films
Italian satirical films
French fantasy comedy-drama films
French satirical films
Films scored by Luis Bacalov
Films directed by Federico Fellini
Films with screenplays by Federico Fellini
1980s satirical films
1980s Italian films
1980s French films